Henry Hastie was an English professional footballer who played as a full back.

References

Year of birth missing
Year of death missing
People from Padiham
English footballers
Association football defenders
Burnley F.C. players
Fleetwood Town F.C. players
Morecambe F.C. players
English Football League players